James H. Kuklinski (born April 14, 1946) is an American political scientist.

Kuklinski graduated from the University of Wisconsin–Madison in 1968 and earned a doctorate at the University of Iowa in 1975. He held the Matthew T. McClure Professorship at the University of Illinois Urbana–Champaign, and was granted emeritus status upon retirement.

Selected publications

References

1946 births
Living people
American political scientists
University of Iowa alumni
University of Wisconsin–Madison alumni
University of Chicago faculty
Political psychologists